Isbukta is a bay in Sørkapp Land at Spitsbergen, Svalbard. It is located at the eastern shore of Spitsbergen, extending between Morenetangen and  Nordre Randberget. The glacier Vasil'evbreen debouches into the bay from north, and Sørkappfonna debouches into the bay from the south.

References

Bays of Spitsbergen